Li Xue Yan (born 15 October 1985) is a Chinese sport shooter.

She participated at the 2018 ISSF World Shooting Championships, winning a medal.

References

External links

Living people
1985 births
Chinese female sport shooters
Running target shooters
21st-century Chinese women